Brewer is a surname, meaning a person who brews beer. Notable people with the surname include:

Alan West Brewer (1915–2007), Canadian-English physicist and climatologist.
Albert Brewer (1928–2017), American politician, Governor of Alabama 1968–71
Allison Brewer (born 1954), Canadian social activist and politician
Ashleigh Brewer (born 1990), Australian actress
The Brewer twins (Derek and Keith, born 1973), American models
Bill Brewer, British philosopher
Billy Brewer (born 1935), American football coach
Billy Brewer (died 1914), English professional footballer
Bryan Brewer, president of the Oglala Sioux Tribe 2012-2014
Carl Brewer (ice hockey) (1938–2001), Canadian ice hockey player
Carl Brewer (politician) (1957-2020), American politician, former mayor of Wichita, Kansas
Chandler Brewer (born 1997), American football player
Charles Brewer (businessman) (born 1958), American entrepreneur
Chester Brewer (1875–1953), American college sports coach
Chet Brewer (1907–1990), American baseball player
C. J. Brewer (disambiguation), multiple people
Contessa Brewer (born 1974), American television journalist
Corey Brewer (born 1986), American basketball player
Corey Brewer (basketball, born 1975) (born 1975), American basketball player
Craig Brewer (born 1971), American film director
David Brewer (disambiguation), several people
Derek Brewer (born 1982), American data analyst, multi-instrumentalist
Dewell Brewer (born 1970), American football player
Don Brewer (born 1948), American drummer
E. Cobham Brewer (1810–1897), compiler of Brewer's Dictionary of Phrase and Fable
Earl L. Brewer (1869–1942), American politician, Governor of Mississippi 1912–1916 
Eduardo Brewer (born 1978), Panamanian Architect
Eric Brewer (ice hockey) (born 1979), Canadian ice hockey player
Eric Brewer (scientist), American scientist
Frederick Mason Brewer (1903–1963), English inorganic chemist
Gale Brewer (born 1951), American politician
Gay Brewer (1932–2007), American golfer
Gene Brewer (born 1937), American science fiction author
George Keefer Brewer (1914–1959), American actor (George Reeves)
Graeme Brewer (born 1958), Australian swimmer
Gurley Brewer (1866–1919), American attorney, publisher, and political activist
Harper Brewer Jr. (born 1937), American politician
Herbert Brewer (1865–1928), British composer
Jack Brewer (disambiguation), several people
Jamison Brewer (born 1980), American basketball player
Jan Brewer (born 1944), Governor of Arizona, 2009–15
Jane Brewer (1924-2017), mayor of Cambridge, Ontario
James Brewer (disambiguation), several people including:
Jim Brewer (baseball) (1937–1987), American baseball player
John Sherren Brewer (1810–1879), English historian
Johnny Brewer (1937–2011), American football player
Julia Hartley-Brewer (born 1968), British journalist
Ken Brewer (1941-2006), American poet
Lingg Brewer (born 1944), American politician and educator
Lucy Brewer, literary pen-name of first woman Marine
Margaret A. Brewer (1930–2013), United States Marine Corps general
Marilyn Brewer (born 1937), American politician
Mark Brewer (disambiguation), several people
Mike Brewer (disambiguation), several people
Neil Brewer (British musician and songwriter)
Nick Brewer (born 1979), American multi-instrumentalist
Nicole Brewer (born 1983), American beauty queen
Richard B. Brewer (1951–2012), American businessman
Richard M. Brewer (Dick Brewer, 1850–1878), American cowboy
Rick Brewer, Canadian politician
Robert Brewer (disambiguation), several people
Ron Brewer (born 1955), American basketball player
Ronnie Brewer (born 1985), American basketball player
Sarina Brewer, American artist
Talbot Brewer, American philosopher
Teresa Brewer (1931–2007), American singer
Thomas Mayo Brewer (1814–1880), American naturalist
Tom Brewer (1931–2018), American baseball player
Trevor Brewer (1930–2018), Welsh rugby union international player
William D. Brewer (1922–2009), American ambassador
William Henry Brewer (1828–1910), American botanist
Wilmon Brewer (1895–1998), American classical scholar

See also
Brasseur
Brauer
Bernie Brewer, Bonnie Brewer, mascots for the Milwaukee Brewers
Breuer
Brewster
Brouwer
 Sládek

English-language surnames
Occupational surnames
English-language occupational surnames